As of June 2021, the population of Singapore stands at 5.45 million. Of these 5.45 million people, 4 million are residents, consisting of 3.5 million citizens and 500,000 permanent residents (PRs). The remaining 1.45 million people living in Singapore are classed as non-residents, a group consisting mainly of foreign students and individuals on work passes.

Singapore is a multiracial, multiethnic, and multicultural Asian society. Major religions include Buddhism, Christianity, Islam, Taoism, and Hinduism. Its people are broadly organised under the CMIO (Chinese–Malay–Indian–Other) system of categorisation. Although Malays are recognised as the indigenous community, 75.9% of the population are ethnic Chinese, with ethnic Malays and Indians comprising 15.0% and 7.5% respectively. Together, the three largest ethnic groups comprise 98.4% of the citizen population. The remaining 1.6% comprises members of "Other" races, which comprises largely Eurasians. Officially, mixed-race Singaporeans are often regarded as having the race of their father. However, race categorisation, for example on an individual's identity card, may also reflect both ethnicities of their parents.

There are four official languages in Singapore – English, Malay, Mandarin and Tamil. Malay is the symbolic national language, while English is the main working language. Education in Singapore is bilingual, with English being the medium of instruction. Students are also required to learn a second language, usually Malay, Mandarin, or Tamil. Singlish, a local creole and accent, is often used in colloquial speech between all native races of Singapore. There is also Singdarin, a Mandarin creole.

The annual total population growth rate for the year 2020 was -0.3%. Singapore's resident total fertility rate (TFR) was 1.10 in 2020; the Singaporean Chinese, Malay and Indian fertility rates were 0.94, 1.83 and 0.97 respectively. In 2018, the Singaporean Malay fertility rate was about 85% higher than that of Singaporean Chinese and Singaporean Indians, while approximately 70% higher in 2010.

History

Population growth

Population growth in Singapore was for a long period fueled by immigration, starting soon after Stamford Raffles landed in Singapore in 1819, when the population of the island was estimated to be around 1,000. The first official census taken in January 1824 showed that the resident population of Singapore had grown to 10,683: 4,580 Malays, 3,317 Chinese, 1,925 Bugis, 756 natives of India, 74 Europeans, 16 Armenians, and 15 Arabs. Chinese males greatly outnumbered the females; in the 1826 population figures there were 5,747 Chinese males but only 341 Chinese females, in contrast to 2,501 Malay males and 2,289 Malay females. The figures for around a thousand Indians in 1826 are also similarly skewed towards male – 209 male and 35 female Bengalis, 772 males and 5 females from the Coromandel Coast. By 1836, the population figure had risen to 29,980, and marked a change in demographics as the Malays were outnumbered for the first time; 45.9% of the population were Chinese versus 41.9% for Malays (including Javanese and Bugis). Women from China were discouraged from emigrating, and most of the Chinese females in this early period of Singapore were likely  from Malacca; it was noted in 1837 that there were no Chinese women in Singapore who had emigrated directly from China.

The imbalance of the sexes continued for a long period, for example, the 1901 census figures show that there were 130,367 Chinese males compared to 33,674 Chinese females. Such imbalance also meant that fewer people were born in early Singapore, and in the first hundred years, most of the Chinese population in Singapore were immigrants. By the late 1890s, only around 10% of the Chinese population in Singapore were born there. Many of the early migrant workers from China and India did not intend to settle permanently to raise their families in Singapore; they worked to send back remittance to their families back home, and would return to China or India after they had earned enough money. Later an increasing number of Chinese chose to settle permanently in Singapore, especially in the 1920s when it became more favourable to stay in Singapore rather than returning to China. Change in social attitude in the modern era also meant that Chinese women were freer to emigrate from China, and the sex ratio began to normalise. This gradual normalisation of sex ratio led to an increase in the number of native births. Immigration continued to be the main reason for the Chinese population increase in Singapore until the 1931–1947 period when the natural increase in population surpassed the net immigration figure.

After World War II, in the period from 1947 to 1957, Singapore saw a massive population increase mostly due to increased number of native births. The birth rate rose and the death rate fell; the average annual growth rate was 4.4%, of which 1% was due to immigration; Singapore experienced its highest birth rate in 1957 at 42.7 per thousand individuals. (This was also the same year the United States saw its peak birth rate.)

Immigration to Singapore also fell sharply after Singapore independence due to tighter control of immigration from Malaysia and other countries. The population increase became dominated by native births with 315,400 in the 1970–1980 period due to natural increase compared to 24,000 from net migration. However, a lower rate of natural growth in population and the need for low-skill labour resulted in a deliberate shift in policy by the Singapore government to allow more foreigners to live and work in the country, and net migration increased in the 1980–1990 period to nearly 200,000. By the decade of 1990–2000, the net migrant number of over 600,000 had surpassed the natural growth of the population, and accounted for nearly two-thirds of the population increase. The same high level of immigration is also seen in the next decade with 664,083 net migration recorded.

Due to the continued low birth rate, amongst other reasons, the Singapore government has varied its immigration policy over the years. As the demand for labour grew with industrialisation, foreign talent with professional qualifications as well as less-skilled foreign workers has made up a significant and increasing proportion of Singapore's total population since the 2000s and 2010s. Curbs on immigration, however, began to be implemented in the 2010s to ease increasing social issues arising from the high level of immigration.

Population planning

The post-war boom in births led to an interest in family planning, and by 1960, the government publicly funded and supported family planning programmes. After independence in 1965, the birth rate had fallen to 29.5 per thousand individuals, and the natural growth rate had fallen to 2.5%. Birth rates in the 1960s were still perceived as high by the government; on average, a baby was born every 11 minutes in 1965. Kandang Kerbau Hospital (KKH)—which specialised in women's health and was the most popular hospital to have children—saw over 100 deliveries per day in 1962. In 1966, KKH delivered 39835 babies, earning it a place in the Guinness Book of World Records for "largest number of births in a single maternity facility" for ten years. Because there was generally a massive shortage of beds in that era, mothers with routine deliveries were discharged from hospitals within 24 hours.

In September 1965 the Minister for Health, Yong Nyuk Lin, submitted a white paper to Parliament, recommending a "Five-year Mass Family Planning programme" that would reduce the birth rate to 20.0 per thousand individuals by 1970. In 1966, the Family Planning and Population Board (FPPB) had been established based on the findings of the white paper, providing clinical services and public education on family planning.

By 1970, the Stop at Two campaign was firmly established, implementing incentives, disincentives and public exhortation to discourage families from having more than two children. After 1975, the fertility rate declined below replacement level, in a sign that Singapore was undergoing the demographic transition. In 1983, the Graduate Mothers' Scheme was implemented in an attempt to get educated women, especially women with a university degree, to marry and procreate, while the government encouraged women without an O-level degree to get sterilised. This was done out of the Lee Kuan Yew government's belief that for the nation to best develop and avoid hardship, the educated classes should be encouraged to contribute to the nation's breeding pool, while the uneducated should not, sparking the Great Marriage Debate.

In 1986, the government reversed its population policy—except its stance on low-income, lowly-educated women—and initiated the Have Three or More (if you can afford it) campaign, offering cash and public administration incentives to have children. In 2001, the Singapore government started its Baby Bonus scheme.

Singapore has one of the lowest fertility rates in the world. In 2012, Singapore total fertility rate (TFR) was 1.20 children born per woman, a sub-replacement fertility rate. Ethnic Chinese had a fertility of 1.07 in 2004 (1.65 in 1990), while Malays had a TFR of 2.10 (2.69 in 1990). Both figures declined further in 2006. TFR for Indians was 1.30 in 2004 and 1.89 in 1990. The Singapore government has launched several highly publicised attempts to raise the fertility rate and increase awareness of the negative effects of an ageing population, the elderly (65 and above) had constituted 9.9% of its population in 2012; this proportion is still significantly lower than that of many other developed nations, such as the United States and Japan. In February 2015, National University of Singapore launched the "New Age Institute" in conjunction with Washington University in St. Louis to conduct research on this issue.

Area planning 

The population of Singapore are generally housed within new towns, which are large scale satellite housing developments designed to be self contained. It includes public housing units, private housing, a town centre and other amenities. Since the 1950s, Singapore had a city centre surrounded by slums and squatter colonies. By 1959 when Singapore attained self government, the problem of housing shortage had grown. Combined with a fast population growth, it led to congestion and squalor. The new towns planning concept was introduced in July 1952 by the country's public housing authority, Housing and Development Board (HDB), to counter the housing shortage problem and to relocate most of the population crammed within the city centre to other parts of the island. Today, there are 23 new towns and 3 estates within the country, with Bedok being the largest by area and population.

Population white paper

In early 2013, the Parliament of Singapore debated over the policies recommended by the Population White Paper entitled A Sustainable Population for a Dynamic Singapore. Citing that Singapore's 900,000 Baby Boomers would comprise a quarter of the citizen population by 2030 and that its workforce would shrink "from 2020 onwards", the White Paper projected that by 2030, Singapore's "total population could range between 6.5 and 6.9 million", with resident population between 4.2 and 4.4 million and citizen population between 3.6 and 3.8 million. The White Paper called for an increase in the number of foreign workers so as to provide balance between the number of skilled and less-skilled workers, as well as provide healthcare and domestic services. It also claimed that foreign workers help businesses thrive when the economy is good. The motion was passed albeit after amendments made to leave out "population policy" and add focus on infrastructure and transport development.

The White Paper was heavily criticised and panned by opposition parties and government critics. Member of Parliament Low Thia Khiang of the Workers' Party of Singapore had criticised current measures of increasing the fertility rate, claiming that this would lead to an increase of a higher cost of living and discourage young couples from having more kids. As for current immigration policies, he had noted that immigrants were a source of friction for Singaporeans and that an increased population would put more stress and strain on the urban infrastructure. On 16 February 2013, nearly 3,000 people rallied to protest against the White Paper at Hong Lim Park and raised concerns that the increased population would lead to the deterioration of public service and the increase of the cost of living.

Population

Population size and growth by residential status 

Source: Singapore Department of Statistics

Gender composition of resident population 
Source: Singapore Department of Statistics

Age distribution of resident population 
Source: Singapore Department of Statistics

Population by sex and age (Census 30.VI.2020)

Fertility and Mortality 

Source: Department of Statistics of Singapore: Population Trends, 2020

Current vital statistics

Population by area

Ethnic groups

Post-independence
In the post-independence period, the population of Singapore has been categorised into four main groups: Chinese, Malays, Indians, and Others. The CMIO system was first proposed in 1956 to organise the education system of Singapore by four national languages.Although population growth in Singapore was driven by immigration for a long period during the colonial period, the population increase in Singapore became dominated by native births in Singapore around the middle of the 20th century, and boomed after the Second World War. After Singapore became independent in 1965, the free movement of people between Malaysia and Singapore ended, and net immigration dropped to a low level of 24,000 in the decade of 1970–80 due to tighter control on immigration. However, the fertility of the Chinese population declined sharply after the post-war boom, while that of the Malays remained high. There was therefore a corresponding percentage increase of the Malay population, which rose to 14.5% in 1967 after a long period of continual decline.

From the 1980s onwards, the policy on immigration changed; the number of immigrants increased sharply and became again an important factor in the growth of population in Singapore. By the 1990–2000 period, the number of migrants had overtaken the natural population increase, constituting nearly two-thirds of the decadal population increase with 640,571 net migrants including non-residents. While the racial composition of its citizens has been fairly constant in recent years, it shows a shift in the figures for its residents (citizens plus permanent residents). Fewer of the immigrants were Malays, therefore the percentage resident population of the Malays began to fall. Indian residents, however, rose to 9.2% in 2010 due to an increase in the number of Indians migrant workers (compared to 7.4% Indians in the figures for citizens).

The population profile of the country changed dramatically after the relaxation of immigration policy, with a huge increase in the number of transient migrant workers. Official figures show that the number of foreigners on short-term permits (termed 'non-residents') has grown from 30,900 in 1970 to 797,900 in 2005, which translate roughly to a 24-fold increase in 35 years, or from 1% of the population in 1970 to 18.3% in 2005. Despite this huge increase, no further breakdown is given by Singstat. By 2010, the population of non-residents had increased to 25.7%. It was estimated in the mid-2010s that around 40% of Singapore's population were of foreign origin (permanent residents plus non-residents such as foreign students and workers including dependents).

While the Singapore Department of Statistics reports overall population figures for Singapore (4.48 million in 2006), as a matter of policy, it only provides more detailed demographic breakdown analysis for the approximately 80% of the population (in 2006) who are Singapore citizens and Permanent Residents (collectively termed 'residents'). Of this group of about 3.6 million people in 2006, Chinese form 75.2%, Malays form 13.6%, Indians form 8.8%, while Eurasians and other groups form 2.4%. No breakdown by ethnicity is released for the non-resident population. Currently around 60,000 Europeans and 16,900 Eurasians live in Singapore, over 1% of its total population.

Pre-Independence 
Singapore, following its founding as a British free port by Stamford Raffles in the 19th century, did not have a sizeable native population as the population became dominated by three main groups of immigrants. When Raffles arrived in Singapore in January 1819, Singapore had approximately 120 Malays, 30 Chinese and some native tribes (Orang Laut) under the rule of the Temenggung. Around 100 of the Malays had originally moved to Singapore from the mainland (Johor) in 1811, led by the Temenggung. Other estimates place the then population of Singapore at 1,000, belonging to various local tribes. Early census figures show a long influx of migrant workers into the country, initially comprising mostly Malays, but shortly thereafter followed by the Chinese. By 1821, the population was estimated to have increased to 4,724 Malays and 1,150 Chinese.

In the first census of 1824, 6,505 out of the 10,683 total were Malays and Bugis, constituting over 60% of the population. Large number of Chinese migrants started to enter Singapore just months after it became a British settlement, and they were predominantly male. In 1826, official census figures give a total population of 13,750, with 6,088 Chinese, 4,790 Malays, 1,242 Bugis, 1,021 Indians from Bengal (244) and the Coromandel Coast (777), smaller number of Javanese (267), Europeans (87) and other peoples. The population total of Singapore increased to 16,000 in 1829, 26,000 five years later. By 1836, the Chinese at 13,749 had become the most populous ethnic group, overtaking the broad Malay grouping (12,538, including other groups such as the Bugis, Javanese, and Balinese from the Dutch East Indies). By 1849, the population had reached 59,043, 24,790 of them Chinese.

Many of the migrants from China in the 19th century came to work on the pepper and gambier plantations, with 11,000 Chinese immigrants recorded in one year. Singapore became one of the entry and dispersal points for large number of Chinese and Indian migrants who came to work in the plantations and mines of the Straits Settlements, many of whom then settled in Singapore after their contract ended. By 1860, the total population had reached around 90,000, of these 50,000 were Chinese, and 2,445 Europeans and Eurasians. The first thorough census in Singapore was undertaken in 1871, and the people were grouped into 33 racial, ethnic or national categories, with Chinese forming the largest group at 57.6%.

Censuses were then conducted at 10-year intervals afterwards. The 1881 census grouped the people into 6 main categories, and further subdivided into 47 sub-categories. The 6 broad groups were given as Europeans, Eurasians, Malays, Chinese, Indians and Others in 1921. The Malays group included other natives of the Malay archipelago, the Europeans included Americans, the Indians would be people from the Indian subcontinent including what are now Pakistan and Bangladesh. In 1901, the total population of Singapore was 228,555, with 15.8% Malays, 71.8% Chinese, 7.8% Indians, and 3.5% Europeans and Eurasians. The Chinese population figure of Singapore has stayed at over 70% of the total since, reaching 77.8% in 1947. After dropping from a peak of 60% in the early years of Singapore, the Malay population settled within the range of 11 and 16% in the first half of the 20th century, while Indians hovered between 7 and just over 9% in the same period.

 Population figures do not include transient populations of military personnel and convicts
 Mostly of Portuguese descent
 Include other peoples of the Malay Archipelago if figures not given separately
 Include Balinese
 Include Cafres, Siamese, Parsis, Jews, and other groupings if figures not given separately.

Languages

Singapore has four official languages: English, Malay, Mandarin and Tamil.

Malay is the national language of the country, although English is the official language used in the educational system and by the government. The colloquial English-based creole used in everyday life is often referred to as Singlish, spoken by all races of Singapore.

The government of Singapore promotes the use of Mandarin. The use of other Chinese varieties, like Hokkien, Teochew, Cantonese and Hakka, has been declining over the last two decades, although they are still being used especially by the older generations of the Chinese population.

About 60% of Indian Singaporeans are Tamils although the percentage of those who speak Tamil at home has been declining, with around 37% of Singaporean Indians speaking Tamil at home according to the 2010 census. Other spoken Indian languages are Punjabi, Malayalam, Hindi and Bengali, but none of them alone is spoken by more than 10% of the Indian Singaporeans. As with Chinese Singaporean, a large proportion of Indian Singaporeans speak English at home.

Around 5,000 to 10,000 Peranakans, the early Chinese population of the region, still use the Hokkien-influenced Malay dialect called Baba Malay.

Religion

The main religions of Singapore are Buddhism, Taoism, Islam, Christianity, and Hinduism, with a significant number who profess no religion.

Singapore has freedom of religion, although the government restricts some religions such as Jehovah's Witnesses, due to their opposition to conscription. The majority of Malays are Muslim, while the plurality of Chinese practise Buddhism and syncretic Chinese folk traditions. Christianity is growing in the country. Taoism was overtaken as the second-most important religion in the 2000 census among the Chinese as more have increasingly described themselves as Buddhists rather than Taoist. Indians are mostly Hindus though many are Muslims, Sikhs, and Christians. People who practise no religion form the third-largest group in Singapore.

Marriage and divorce

Literacy and education

Among residents aged 25–39 years, the percentage of university graduates increased from 23.7% in 2001 to 45.9% in 2011 while that who had attained a diploma or professional qualification increased from 15.9% to 22.9% over the same period.

Employment
In 2005, the unemployment rate for persons aged 15 years and over was 2.5%, the lowest in the last four years, with a labour force of 2.3 million people.

Household income

Average household monthly income
The average household monthly income was SGD 4,943 in 2000, which was an increase of $3,080 in 1990 at an average annual rate of 4.9%. The average household income experienced a drop of 2.7% in 1999 due to economic slowdown. Measured in 1990 dollars, the average household monthly income rose from SGD$3,080 in 1990 to SGD$4,170 in 2000 at an average annual rate of 2.8%.

Household income distribution

Growth in household income by decile
With the recovery from the 1998 economic slowdown, household income growth had resumed for the majority of households in 2000. However, for the lowest two deciles, the average household income in 2000 had declined compared with 1999. This was mainly due to the increase in the proportion of households with no income earner from 75% in 1999 to 87% in 2000 for the lowest 10%. Households with no income earner include those with retired elderly persons as well as unemployed members.

Household income ratio
The disparity in household income had widened in 2000, reflecting the faster income growth for the higher-income households.

International rankings

See also

 Singaporeans
 Malay Singaporeans
 Chinese Singaporeans
 Indian Singaporeans
 Arab Singaporeans
 Eurasians in Singapore
 Population planning in Singapore

References

External links
 
Census 2000
Singapore Dept of Statistics

 
Singapore